The Canton of Montdidier  is a former canton situated in the department of the Somme and in the Picardie region of northern France. It was disbanded following the French canton reorganisation which came into effect in March 2015. It consisted of 34 communes, which joined the canton of Roye in 2015. It had 12,605 inhabitants (2012).

Geography 
The canton is organised around the commune of Montdidier in the arrondissement of Montdidier. The altitude varies from 40m (Hargicourt) to 155m (Villers-Tournelle) for an average of 121m.

The canton comprised 34 communes:

Andechy
Assainvillers
Ayencourt
Becquigny
Bouillancourt-la-Bataille
Boussicourt
Bus-la-Mésière
Cantigny
Le Cardonnois
Courtemanche
Davenescourt
Erches
Ételfay
Faverolles
Fescamps
Fignières
Fontaine-sous-Montdidier
Gratibus
Grivillers
Guerbigny
Hargicourt
Laboissière-en-Santerre
Lignières
Malpart
Marestmontiers
Marquivillers
Mesnil-Saint-Georges
Montdidier
Piennes-Onvillers
Remaugies
Rollot
Rubescourt
Villers-Tournelle
Warsy

Population

See also
 Arrondissements of the Somme department
 Cantons of the Somme department
 Communes of the Somme department

References

Montdidier
2015 disestablishments in France
States and territories disestablished in 2015